The Oregon Buttes are small buttes, near the Oregon Trail, in what is now the state of Wyoming.

They are just past South Pass, and are two flat-topped summits plus a smaller, conical one. For travelers on the Oregon Trail, the buttes were on the horizon for a day's travel, perhaps more. This was as they crossed Rock Creek, then Willow Creek, and, for the last time, the Sweetwater River.

Pioneers on the trails used physically descriptive names for the buttes: "Table Rock," or "Table Rocks."

Currently, they are in a remote area and can be difficult to get to. From the top of a butte one can see for miles, including to the north the Wind River Mountains, and to the southwest the Unitah Mountain Range.

They are flat-topped.

Petrified wood is found in the area, but it is closed for hunting of minerals, as well as gold panning.

This site is where the Oregon Territory, First Mexican Empire, and the Louisiana Purchase met at a single point.

Their relationship to the Oregon Trail

As the Oregon Buttes are just pass South Pass over the Rocky Mountains, to pioneers on the Oregon Trail they signified the entrance to the Oregon Territory. In 1843, Theodore Talbot wrote "Today we set foot in the Oregon Territory, the land of promise." But hardships already experienced made him feel cautious, and probably thinking of recent hard travel, he added, "As of yet it only promises an increased supply of sage and sand." Joseph Warren Wood wrote "We are now in Oregon," In general, travelers on the Oregon Trail considered Oregon Buttes as marking the trail's halfway point. Pioneers also felt they had entered the Pacific Watershed.

Geography

The Continental Divide of the Americas splits at Oregon Buttes; to the southeast is the Great Divide Basin.

Ecology

In Oregon Buttes there are many types of vegetation which include thick stands of aspen, stands of limber pine, plus meadows. The area is prime raptor habitat.

References

External links and references

 Some photos
 Peakbagger on climbing North Butte
 SummitPost on climbing South Oregon Butte
 SummitPost on climbing North Butte
 Wyoming History site, which has a map
 Oregon Buttes Wilderness Study Area, its area: 5,700 acres

See also

 Boars Tusk
 Crowheart Butte

Buttes of Wyoming